James H. Andreasen (May 16, 1931 – May 14, 2015) was Justice of the Iowa Supreme Court from November 13, 1987, to October 1, 1998, appointed from Kossuth County, Iowa.

References

Justices of the Iowa Supreme Court
2015 deaths
1931 births
Politicians from Minneapolis
Lawyers from Minneapolis
20th-century American judges
20th-century American lawyers